Frogn is a municipality in former Akershus now Viken county, Norway.  It is part of the Follo traditional region.  The administrative centre of the municipality is the town of Drøbak.  Frogn was established as a municipality on 1 January 1838 (see formannskapsdistrikt). The city of Drøbak was merged with Frogn on 1 January 1962.

Frogn is located at the southern part of the peninsula between the main Oslofjord and Bunnefjorden. It borders Nesodden, Ås and Vestby.

General information

Name 
The municipality (originally the parish) is named after the old Frogn farm (Old Norse: Fraun), since the first church was built here. The name must be very old and the meaning is unknown. One theory is that it is derived from the Norse word frauð which means "manure" and the meaning would then be "the fertilized field". (See also Frogner and Tøyen.)

Prior to 1889, the name was written "Fron". Between 1837 and 1865, the name of the municipality was Drøbak landdistrikt.

Coat-of-arms 
The coat-of-arms is from modern times.  They were granted on 20 May 1988.  The arms symbolize the Oscarsborg Fortress in silver on a blue background. The fortress is on the Drøbaksund in the Oslofjord in the municipality. The fortress was built in the late 19th century and played a major role in the defence of Norway in the beginning of World War II.

Notable people 

 Niels Carlsen (1734 in Drøbak – 1809) a timber merchant, landowner, shipowner and banker
 Jens Carl Peter Brandt (1848 in Frogn – 1912) lawyer, property owner and Mayor of Frogn, 1884 to 1895
 Carl Julius Evensen (1851 in Drøbak – 1937) a Norwegian shipmaster and Antarctic explorer
 Håkon Anton Fagerås (born 1975 in Drøbak) a Norwegian sculptor
 Gunnar Isachsen (1868 in Drøbak – 1939) a Norwegian military officer and polar scientist
 Louise Isachsen (1875 in Drøbak – 1932) a physician, Norway's first female surgeon
 Per Deberitz (1880 in Drøbak – 1945) a Norwegian neo-impressionist painter 
 Viggo Brun (1885–1978 in Drøbak) a professor, mathematician and number theorist
 Noralv Teigen (1932 – 2017 in Drøbak) an actor, theatre instructor and theatre director 
 Øystein Øystå (1934–2014) a Norwegian writer and long-jumper, lived in Drøbak
 Olav Skjevesland (1942 in Drøbak – 2019) theologian, Bishop of Agder og Telemark
 Martin Schanche (born 1945) former racing driver, now aspiring politician, lives in Drøbak
 Terje Mikkelsen (born 1957 in Drøbak) a Norwegian conductor
 Solveig Kringlebotn (born 1963 in Drøbak) Norwegian operatic soprano
 Sven Ombudstvedt (born 1966) a businessperson, CEO of Norske Skog, lives in Drøbak
 Arifur Rahman (born 1984) a Bangladeshi-Norwegian political cartoonist, illustrator and animator; lives in Drøbak

Sport 
 Gunnar Andersen (1890 in Drøbak – 1968) a footballer with 46 caps for Norway and ski jumper
 Tore Johannessen (1922–2005) an ice hockey referee, lived in Drøbak
 Pål Trulsen (born 1962) a curler, team gold medallist at 2002 Winter Olympics
 Anders Pedersen (sailor) (born 1991), is a Norwegian competitive sailor.
 Andrine Tomter (born 1995) a footballer with 170 club caps and 16 with Norway women
 Viktor Hovland (born 1997) a Professional golfer who plays on the PGA Tour grew up in Drøbak

International relations

Twin towns — Sister cities
The following cities are twinned with Frogn:
  - Åmål, Västra Götaland County, Sweden
  - Loimaa, Länsi-Suomi, Finland
  - Türi, Järva County. Estonia

References

External links 
 
 
 Municipal fact sheet from Statistics Norway
 
 

 
Municipalities of Akershus
Municipalities of Viken (county)